Defending champion Shingo Kunieda and his partner Satoshi Saida defeated the other four-time defending champion Robin Ammerlaan and his partner Ronald Vink in the final, 6–4, 6–3 to win the men's doubles wheelchair tennis title at the 2008 Australian Open.

Seeds

 Shingo Kunieda /  Satoshi Saida (champions)
 Robin Ammerlaan /  Ronald Vink (final)

Draw

Finals
{{16TeamBracket-Compact-Tennis3
| RD1=First round
| RD2=Quarterfinals
| RD3=Semifinals
| RD4=Finals

| RD1-seed01=1
| RD1-team01= Shingo Kunieda Satoshi Saida
| RD1-score01-1=
| RD1-score01-2=
| RD1-score01-3=
| RD1-seed02= 
| RD1-team02=BYEBYE
| RD1-score02-1=
| RD1-score02-2=
| RD1-score02-3=

| RD1-seed03= 
| RD1-team03= Yoshinobu Fujimoto Tony Lara
| RD1-score03-1=4
| RD1-score03-2=1
| RD1-score03-3=
| RD1-team04= Robinson Mendez Nicolas Peifer
| RD1-seed04= 
| RD1-score04-1=6
| RD1-score04-2=6
| RD1-score04-3=

| RD1-seed05= 
| RD1-team05= Frédéric Cattanéo Martin Legner
| RD1-score05-1=
| RD1-score05-2=
| RD1-score05-3=
| RD1-seed06= 
| RD1-team06=BYEBYE
| RD1-score06-1=
| RD1-score06-2=
| RD1-score06-3=

| RD1-seed07= 
| RD1-team07= Takahiro Hirate David Latham
| RD1-score07-1=2
| RD1-score07-2=6
| RD1-score07-3=[10]
| RD1-seed08= 
| RD1-team08= Michael Dobbie Steffen Sommerfield
| RD1-score08-1=6
| RD1-score08-2=1
| RD1-score08-3=7

| RD1-seed09= 
| RD1-team09= Tadeusz Kruszelnicki Jon Rydberg
| RD1-score09-1=5
| RD1-score09-2=6
| RD1-score09-3=9
| RD1-seed10= 
| RD1-team10=
| RD1-score10-1=7
| RD1-score10-2=1
| RD1-score10-3=11

| RD1-seed11= 
| RD1-team11=BYEBYE
| RD1-score11-1=
| RD1-score11-2=
| RD1-score11-3=
| RD1-seed12= 
| RD1-team12= Stéphane Houdet Michaël Jérémiasz
| RD1-score12-1=
| RD1-score12-2=
| RD1-score12-3=

| RD1-seed13= 
| RD1-team13= Maikel Scheffers Eric Stuurman
| RD1-score13-1=3
| RD1-score13-2=6
| RD1-score13-3=4
| RD1-seed14= 
| RD1-team14= Niclas Larsson David Phillipson
| RD1-score14-1=6
| RD1-score14-2=1
| RD1-score14-3=[10]

| RD1-seed15= 
| RD1-team15=BYEBYE
| RD1-score15-1=
| RD1-score15-2=
| RD1-score15-3=
| RD1-seed16=2
| RD1-team16= Robin Ammerlaan Ronald Vink
| RD1-score16-1=
| RD1-score16-2=
| RD1-score16-3=

| RD2-seed01=1
| RD2-team01= Shingo Kunieda Satoshi Saida
| RD2-score01-1=6
| RD2-score01-2=6
| RD2-score01-3=
| RD2-seed02= 
| RD2-team02=
| RD2-score02-1=1
| RD2-score02-2=2
| RD2-score02-3=

| RD2-seed03= 
| RD2-team03= Frédéric Cattanéo Martin Legner
| RD2-score03-1=1
| RD2-score03-2=3
| RD2-score03-3=
| RD2-seed04= 
| RD2-team04= Takahiro Hirate David Latham
| RD2-score04-1=6
| RD2-score04-2=6
| RD2-score04-3=

| RD2-seed05= 
| RD2-team05= Anthony Bonaccurso Ben Weeks
| RD2-score05-1=1
| RD2-score05-2=2
| RD2-score05-3=
| RD2-seed06= 
| RD2-team06= Stéphane Houdet Michaël Jérémiasz
| RD2-score06-1=6
| RD2-score06-2=6
| RD2-score06-3=

| RD2-seed07= 
| RD2-team07= Niclas Larsson David Phillipson
| RD2-score07-1=4
| RD2-score07-2=2
| RD2-score07-3=
| RD2-seed08=2
| RD2-team08= Robin Ammerlaan Ronald Vink
| RD2-score08-1=6
| RD2-score08-2=6
| RD2-score08-3=

| RD3-seed01=1
| RD3-team01= Shingo Kunieda Satoshi Saida
| RD3-score01-1=6
| RD3-score01-2=6
| RD3-score01-3=
| RD3-team02= Takahiro Hirate David Latham
| RD3-seed02= 
| RD3-score02-1=0
| RD3-score02-2=2
| RD3-score02-3=

| RD3-seed03= 
| RD3-team03= Stéphane Houdet Michaël Jérémiasz
| RD3-score03-1=2
| RD3-score03-2=0
| RD3-score03-3=
| RD3-seed04=2
| RD3-team04=

Wheelchair Men's Doubles
2008,Men's Doubles